Àlex Corretja defeated Boris Becker in the final, 7–6(7–5), 7–5, 6–3 to win the singles tennis title at the 1998 Swiss Open.

Félix Mantilla was the defending champion, but lost in the quarterfinals to Becker.

This tournament marked the first professional appearance of future 20-time major champion and world No. 1 Roger Federer; he lost in the first round to lucky loser Lucas Arnold Ker.

Seeds
Champion seeds are indicated in bold text while text in italics indicates the round in which those seeds were eliminated.

Draw

Finals

Top half

Bottom half

Qualifying

Qualifying seeds
{{columns-list|colwidth=30em|
  Lucas Arnold Ker (qualifying competition, Lucky loser)  Oliver Gross (qualified)
  Jacobo Díaz (first round)  Attila Sávolt (second round)  Quino Muñoz (second round)  Agustín Garizzio (qualifying competition)  Tomás Carbonell (qualified)
  Óscar Serrano (second round)}}

Qualifiers

Lucky loser
  Lucas Arnold Ker (replaced  Tommy Haas)''

Qualifying draw

First qualifier

Second qualifier

Third qualifier

Fourth qualifier

References

External links
 Official results archive (ATP)
 Official results archive (ITF)

Swiss Open (tennis)
Singles